Acacia spooneri is a shrub of the genus Acacia and the subgenus Phyllodineae. It is native to a small area in South Australia

Description
It has glabrous and reddish brown branchlets. Like most species of Acacia it has phyllodes rather than true leaves. The pale green to grey-green glabrous phyllodes have a narrowly elliptic to obovate or oblanceolate shape. It blooms throughout the year most prolifically between May and August.

Taxonomy
A. spooneri was first described by M.C. O'Leary in 2002.

Distribution
It is found around Brachina Gorge and Wilpena Pound in the north and around Nectar Brook on the Winninowie Range in the south. It is often situated on rocky ridgetops as a part of mallee communities over spinifex grassland or in Callitris pine communities.

See also
List of Acacia species

References

spooneri
Flora of South Australia
Plants described in 2002